St. Joseph's Catholic Church, also known as St. Joseph Miller Street Catholic Church, is a historic wooden Roman Catholic church located at 1422 Northeast Miller Street in Palm Bay, Brevard County, Florida.

Description

Adjacent to the church is historic Saint Joseph Catholic Cemetery.

On December 3, 1987, the church building was added to the U.S. National Register of Historic Places.

Current status
Saint Joseph Catholic Community is still an active parish in Palm Bay. Its main church building is located at 5530 Babcock Street, Northeast]. The Miller Street Church continues in use the chapel for the cemetery, which is still active.

Saint Joseph's Catholic Cemetery

Notable interments
John P. Donohue

References and external links

Brevard County listings at National Register of Historic Places
Florida's Office of Cultural and Historical Programs
Brevard County listings
St. Joseph's Catholic Church

Roman Catholic Diocese of Palm Beach
Cemeteries in Florida
Churches in Brevard County, Florida
National Register of Historic Places in Brevard County, Florida
Palm Bay, Florida
Churches on the National Register of Historic Places in Florida
Roman Catholic churches in Florida
Wooden churches in Florida